John Moore-Stevens may refer to:
 John Moore-Stevens (priest)
 John Moore-Stevens (MP)